The Journal of the Anthropological Society of Oxford is a peer-reviewed academic journal of anthropology that was established in 1970. Publishing the print edition was discontinued in 2000 and in 2009 the journal was re-launched as an open access online journal without publishing fees (diamond open access). All the back-issues and occasional papers are available online. The editor-in-chief is Bob Parkin who has also written about the history of the journal. Malcolm Chapman also discusses the history in his introduction to Edwin Ardener's essays.

Abstracting and indexing
The journal is abstracted and indexed by the Anthropological Index Online and International Bibliography of the Social Sciences.

References

External links

Copyright information at SHERPA ROMEO
Print: 
Online: 

Biannual journals
English-language journals
Open_access_journals
Online-only_journals
Anthropology journals
Academic journals published by learned and professional societies
Publications established in 1970
1970 establishments in the United Kingdom